Megantoni National Sanctuary (Santuario Nacional de Megantoni) is a protected area in Peru situated in the Cusco Region, La Convención Province, Echarate and Megantoni districts. It protects a part of the Peruvian Yungas ecoregion.

See also 
 Machiguenga Communal Reserve
 Natural and Cultural Peruvian Heritage

References

External links 
 www.enjoyperu.com / Megantoni National Sanctuary (Spanish)

National sanctuaries of Peru
Geography of Cusco Region
Protected areas established in 2004